The Malabar woodshrike (Tephrodornis sylvicola) is a species of bird usually placed in the family Vangidae.  It is found in western India.  It is sometimes considered a subspecies of the large woodshrike.

Gallery

References

Rasmussen, P.C., and J.C. Anderton. 2005. Birds of South Asia. The Ripley guide. Volume 2: attributes and status. Smithsonian Institution and Lynx Edicions, Washington D.C. and Barcelona.

Tephrodornis
Birds described in 1839
Birds of India
Endemic fauna of the Western Ghats